Cajvana is a town in Suceava County, northeastern Romania. It is situated in the historical region of Bukovina. Cajvana is the twelfth-largest urban settlement in the county, with a population of 6,812 inhabitants, according to the 2011 census. It was declared a town in 2004, along with seven other localities in Suceava County. One village, Codru, is administered by the town.

The town is known for its legendary oak tree, which dates from the time of Moldavian ruler Stephen the Great (1457–1504). Despite being a town, Cajvana has a rural aspect and the main occupation of the inhabitants is agriculture. The locality was severely affected by the European floods in 2005.

Natives
 Maria Băsescu

Notes

External links

  Cajvana Town Hall web page
  Cajvana High School
  Suceava County site – Cajvana web page

Populated places in Suceava County
Towns in Romania
Localities in Southern Bukovina